Mergen Mamedov (born 24 December 1990) is a Turkmenistan athlete. He competed in  hammer throw at the 2012 Summer Olympics in London. Master of Sport of International Class in Turkmenistan.

Career
Mergen Mämmedow took up the sport in 2003 in Ashgabat, Turkmenistan. Graduated National Institute of Sports and Tourism of Turkmenistan.

Mämmedow competing at the Athletics at the 2020 Summer Olympics – Men's hammer throw Schwndke threw 67.53 m to finish 30 in qualifying heat.

References

External links

Turkmenistan male hammer throwers
1990 births
Living people
Athletes (track and field) at the 2012 Summer Olympics
Olympic athletes of Turkmenistan
Athletes (track and field) at the 2014 Asian Games
Athletes (track and field) at the 2018 Asian Games
Asian Games competitors for Turkmenistan
Athletes (track and field) at the 2020 Summer Olympics